is a Japanese actor, voice actor and narrator from Yamaguchi Prefecture. He is affiliated with Aoni Production.

He is most known for the roles of Tetsuya Tsurugi in Great Mazinger, Gantsu Sensei in Ganbare!! Robocon and Shinemon Ninagawa in Ikkyū-san.

Filmography

Television animation
Cyborg 009 (1968) – Pyunma/008
Moretsu Atarou (1969) – Kemunbasu
Tiger Mask (1969) – Announcer
Devilman (1972) – Abel, God
Babel II (1973) – Rodem
Great Mazinger (1974) – Tetsuya Tsurugi
Ikkyū-san (1975) – Shinemon Ninagawa
Maya the Honey Bee (1975) - Schnuck
Captain Future (1978) – Otho, Narration
Cyborg 009 (1979) – Jet Link/002
Dr. Slump (1985) – Dr. Mashirito [4th voice]
Ginga: Nagareboshi Gin (1986) – Narrator
Hug! Pretty Cure (2018) - Bakuhatsu Aisaki
Saint Seiya (1986) – Cepheus Albiore
Transformers: The Headmasters (1987) – Shouki/Raiden
Transformers: Super God Masterforce (1988) – Narrator, Giga, Overlord
Mahoromatic (2001) – Slash
One Piece (2003) – Saint Jaygarcia Saturn
This Ugly Yet Beautiful World (2004) – Ioneos

OVA
2001 Nights (1987) – Clarke
Legend of the Galactic Heroes (1989) – Fritz Josef Bittenfeld
Transformers: Zone (1990) – Narrator, Overlord

Theatrical animation
Flying Phantom Ship (1969) – Announcer
Kinnikuman: Great Riot! Seigi Choujin (1984) – Shishkeba Boo
Mai Mai Miracle (2009) – Kotaro Aoki
Detective Conan: The Lost Ship in the Sky (2010) – Takamichi Fujioka

Video games
Xenosaga Series (xxxx-xx) – Johachim Mizrahi
Gungriffon (1996) – Narrator
Super Robot Wars F  (1997) - Tetsuya Tsurugi
Super Robot Wars F Final  (1998) - Tetsuya Tsurugi
Super Robot Wars Complete Box  (1999) - Tetsuya Tsurugi
Super Robot Wars 64  (1999) - Tetsuya Tsurugi
Super Robot Wars Alpha  (2000) - Tetsuya Tsurugi
Super Robot Wars Alpha Gaiden  (2001) - Tetsuya Tsurugi
Super Robot Wars Impact  (2002) - Tetsuya Tsurugi
2nd Super Robot Wars Alpha  (2003) - Tetsuya Tsurugi
Super Robot Wars MX  (2004) - Tetsuya Tsurugi
3rd Super Robot Wars Alpha: To the End of the Galaxy  (2005) - Tetsuya Tsurugi
Ultraman Fighting Evolution Rebirth (2005) – Captain Pilot
Real Robot Regiment  (2005) – Tetsuya Tsurugi
Super Robot Wars A Portable  (2008) - Tetsuya Tsurugi
Super Robot Wars Z  (2008) - Tetsuya Tsurugi
Persona 5  (2016) – Toranouske Yoshida
Super Robot Wars X  (2018) -  Hopes

Tokusatsu
Hikari no Senshi Diamond Eye (1973) – voice of Diamond Eye (Ep8 - 26)
Robot Detective (1973) – Narrator
Ganbare!! Robokon (1974) – voice of Gantz-sensei
Moero!! Robokon (1999) – voice of Gantz-sensei
Super Sentai SeriesHyakujuu Sentai GaoRanger (2001) – voice of Christmas OrgTokusou Sentai Dekaranger (2004) – voice of Speckionian JenioMahou Sentai Magiranger (2005) – voice of Heavenly Saint Chronogel

Dubbing2010 (1990 TBS edition) – HAL 9000The Blob (1972 NTV edition) – Officer Ritchie (George Karas)Bonnie and Clyde (1974 TV Asahi edition) – Eugene Grizzard (Gene Wilder)Dragon Fist – Fang Gang (James Tien)Thunderbirds'' – Thomas Prescott

References

External links
Official agency profile 

1943 births
Living people
Male voice actors from Yamaguchi Prefecture
Japanese male video game actors
Japanese male voice actors
20th-century Japanese male actors
21st-century Japanese male actors
Aoni Production voice actors